Prince Albert  most commonly refers to:

Albert, Prince Consort (1819–1861), husband and consort of Queen Victoria
Albert II, Prince of Monaco (born 1958), present head of state of Monaco

Prince Albert may also refer to:

Royalty 
 Albert I of Belgium (1875–1934), former head of state of Belgium
 Albert II of Belgium (born 1934), former head of state of Belgium
 Albert I, Prince of Monaco (1848–1922), former head of state of Monaco
 Prince Albert of Prussia (1809–1872)
 Prince Albert of Prussia (1837–1906)
 Prince Albert of Saxe-Altenburg
 Albert of Saxony
 Prince Albert of Saxony (1875–1900)
 Albert, Margrave of Meissen (1934–2012)
 Albert Casimir, Duke of Teschen
 Albert, Prince of Schwarzburg-Rudolstadt (1798–1869), former head of state of Schwarzburg-Rudolstadt
 Albert I, Prince of Thurn and Taxis (1867–1952)
 Albert II, Prince of Thurn and Taxis (born 1983)
 Albert Edward, Prince of Wales (1841–1910), later King Edward VII of the United Kingdom, son of Albert and Victoria
 Prince Albert Victor, Duke of Clarence and Avondale (1864–1892), son of Edward VII
 Prince Albert, Duke of York (1895–1952), later King George VI of the United Kingdom, grandson of Edward VII
 Albert Kamehameha (1858–1862), Crown Prince of Hawaii during his father King Kamehameha IV's reign

Places

Canada 
Prince Albert, Nova Scotia
Prince Albert, Saskatchewan
Prince Albert (electoral district), federal electoral district
Prince Albert (provincial electoral district), Saskatchewan provincial electoral district
Prince Albert National Park, Saskatchewan
Rural Municipality of Prince Albert No. 461, Saskatchewan
Prince Albert Peninsula, Northwest Territories
Prince Albert Impact Crater, or Tunnunik impact crater, found on that peninsula

South Africa 
Prince Albert, Western Cape, a small town in South Africa

Sports 
 "Prince Albert", a stage name of Matt Bloom (born 1972), professional wrestler
 John "Prince" Albert (born 1986), professional MMA fighter

Other uses 
 Prince Albert (genital piercing)
 Prince Albert (tobacco), a brand of pipe tobacco
 Prince Albert, a novel by Richard Church
 Prince Albert coat, a double-breasted frock coat
 Prince Albert grape, another name for the Trollinger grape variety
 , operated by the Hudson's Bay Company from 1841–1856, see Hudson's Bay Company vessels

See also